Francisco José "Kiko" Hervás Jodar (born 16 August 1981 in Esplugues de Llobregat) is a Spanish swimmer. He competed at the 2008 Summer Olympics in Beijing where he finished 13th in the 10 km.

In the same event at the 2012 Summer Olympics, he finished in 23rd place.

References

External links 
 
 Entry in openwaterpedia 

1981 births
Living people
Swimmers at the 2008 Summer Olympics
Swimmers at the 2012 Summer Olympics
Olympic swimmers of Spain
Spanish male long-distance swimmers
20th-century Spanish people
21st-century Spanish people